Elizabeth Ann Roberts (born August 4, 1941) is an American model. She was Playboy magazine's Playmate of the Month for the January 1958 issue. Her centerfold was photographed by Arthur James and Mike Shea.

Career
Elizabeth's pictorial was significant in the history of Playboy because she was only 16 at the time her photos were taken. She had arrived at the Playboy studio with her mother, who provided a written statement that she was 18. After it was revealed that Roberts was underage, Hefner was brought before a domestic relations court on a charge of contributing to the delinquency of a minor. The charges were ultimately dropped on the grounds that Hefner in all likelihood did not know the girl's true age.

Roberts eventually became a Bunny at the Chicago Playboy Club.

Legacy
Her centerfold can be seen in animated form in Ralph Bakshi's film American Pop.

See also
 List of people in Playboy 1953–59

Notes

External links
 

1950s Playboy Playmates
1941 births
Living people